Alfred Burke (28 February 1918 – 16 February 2011) was an English actor, perhaps best known for his portrayal of Frank Marker in the drama series Public Eye, which ran on television for ten years.

Early life
Born in London's south-east district of Peckham, the son of  Sarah Ann O'Leary and William Burke, he was educated at Leo Street Boys' School and Walworth Central School. Burke started work aged 14, working in a railway repair firm in the City of London after leaving school. He became a club steward and also worked in a silk warehouse, joining a local amateur dramatics group before moving to Morley College and winning a scholarship to RADA in 1937. His acting career started two years later at the Barn Theatre in Shere, Surrey. His budding career was interrupted by the Second World War, when he registered as a conscientious objector, and was directed to work on the land.

Career
In the late 1940s, he worked with the Young and Old Vic and other companies. His London debut was in 1950 at the Watergate Theatre, appearing in Pablo Picasso's play Desire Caught by the Tail. He then spent three years with Birmingham Repertory Theatre (1950–53) and appeared in the 1954 West End hit Sailor Beware!.

Burke built a solid reputation across a wide range of character roles in films and on television. His acting career included: The Angry Silence, Touch and Go, Interpol, Yangtse Incident and Buccaneers, as well as such televised plays as The Tip and Treasure Island.

His most famous role was the enquiry agent Frank Marker in the ABC/Thames television series Public Eye, which ran from 1965 to 1975. His low-key, understated but always compelling portrayal of the down-at-heel private eye made the series one of the most popular and highly rated detective dramas on British television.

After Public Eye ended Burke appeared in a host of guises, from Long John Silver to Pope John Paul II's father. In the television series Minder he appeared in the episode Come in T-64, Your Time Is Ticking Away as Kevin, partner to Arthur Daley in his latest scheme, a minicab service. He was also the formidable headmaster "Thrasher" Harris in Home To Roost. He played Major (later Oberst) Richter in both series of Enemy at the Door and Dr Anderson in the Bergerac episode titled Poison. Later he was seen as Armando Dippet in Harry Potter and the Chamber of Secrets.

On stage Burke appeared in several productions by the Royal Shakespeare Company, including Richard II, Romeo and Juliet, Roberto Zucco, The Tempest, Peer Gynt, Measure for Measure, Troilus and Cressida, Two Shakespearean Actors, All's Well That Ends Well and Antony and Cleopatra. In 2008 he appeared at the National Theatre as the Shepherd in a new version of Sophocles' Oedipus by Frank McGuinness.

In 2022 a documentary tribute to Burke was released entitled Alfred Burke is Frank Marker

Death
Burke died from a chest infection on 16 February 2011, twelve days before his 93rd birthday, and was cremated at Golders Green Crematorium. He was survived by his wife, Barbara (née Bonelle) and their four children: Jacob and Harriet (twins), and Kelly and Louisa (twins).

Selected filmography

 The Kid from Brooklyn (1946) – Dancer (uncredited)
 The Constant Husband (1955) – Porter (uncredited)
 Touch and Go (1955) – Man on the Bridge
 Yangtse Incident: The Story of H.M.S. Amethyst (1957) – Petty Officer
 Interpol (1957) – Vincent Cashling
 Let's Be Happy (1957) – French Ticket Clerk
 The Long Haul (1957) – Drunk in Club (uncredited)
 Bitter Victory (1957) – Lt. Colonel Callander
 High Flight (1957) – Controller, Operations Room
 No Time to Die (1958) – Capt. Ritter
 Law and Disorder (1958) – Willis Pugh – Poacher
 The Man Inside (1958) – Mr. Pritchard
 The Man Upstairs (1958) – Mr. Barnes
 Operation Amsterdam (1959) – Dealer
 Model for Murder (1959) – Podd
 Moment of Danger (1960) – Shapley
 The Angry Silence (1960) – Travers
 The Trials of Oscar Wilde (1960) – Reporter
 Dead Lucky (1960) – Knocker Parsons
 The Pot Carriers (1962) – Lang
 Crooks Anonymous (1962) – Caulfield
 She Knows Y'Know (1962) – Mr. Fox
 Mix Me a Person (1962) – Lumley
 On the Beat (1962) – Trigger O'Flynn
 The Small World of Sammy Lee (1963) – Big Eddie
 The Man Who Finally Died (1963) – Heinrich (uncredited)
 Farewell Performance (1963) – Marlon
 Children of the Damned (1964) – Colin Webster
 The Nanny (1965) – Dr. Wills
 Night Caller from Outer Space (1965) – Detective Supt. Hartley
 Guns in the Heather (1969) – Kersner
 One Day in the Life of Ivan Denisovich (1970) – Alyosha
 The House on Garibaldi Street (1979) – Adolf Eichmann
 Harry Potter and the Chamber of Secrets (2002) – Professor Armando Dippet (final film role)

Television roles

Comedy

Selected drama appearances

Selected theatre
 Dr Rance in What the Butler Saw by Joe Orton. Directed by Braham Murray at the Royal Exchange, Manchester. (1977)
 Serebryakov in Uncle Vanya by Anton Chekhov. Directed by Michael Elliott at the Royal Exchange, Manchester. 1977)
 Vincentio in Measure for Measure. Directed by Braham Murray at the Royal Exchange, Manchester. (1981)

References

External links

FilmReference
Interview with Alfred Burke – British Library sound recording

1918 births
2011 deaths
English male film actors
English male television actors
People from Peckham
People from Barnes, London
Alumni of RADA
English conscientious objectors
English male Shakespearean actors
English male stage actors
English people of Irish descent
Male actors from London
20th-century English male actors
21st-century English male actors